Cotia is a municipality in the state of São Paulo in Brazil. It is part of the Metropolitan Region of São Paulo. The population is 253,608 (2020 est.) in an area of 323.99 km². The city is at an elevation of 853 m. Cotia is linked with the Rodovia Raposo Tavares highway.

History 
Cotia was founded in 1580, and was an active village during the "bandeiras" expeditions. In 1626, Raposo Tavares and his companions arrived in the city. The "Sítio do Mandú" and "Sítio do Padre Inácio" (Mandu's Ranch and Priest Inácio's Ranch) were some of the first rural houses to be built there. Nowadays, they are preserved by the "Instituto Brasileiro de Patrimônio Cultural. Cotia was declared an independent municipality on April 2, 1856. According to the 1980 demographic census, the city had a population of over 62 thousand people.

Geography 
The city is located west of São Paulo, and has a terrain made of valleys and mountains, reaching a maximum elevation of 1,074 meters above sea level 

The city has the Cotia River as its main river.

The city has a densely populated urban area, but the less developed areas to the west attract  people interested in ecotourism.  The only naturally occurring case of Brazilian hemorrhagic fever took place here.

Demography

Population history

See also 
 Granja Viana, a district of Cotia

References

External links 

  http://www.cotia.sp.gov.br
  Cotia on citybrazil.com.br
  Encontra Cotia - Find everything about Cotia city
 History of Cotia at the City Hall website

 
1856 establishments in Brazil
Populated places established in 1856